ICAE may refer to:
International Council for Adult Education
International Committee Against Executions